Marshall Field (August 18, 1834January 16, 1906) was an American entrepreneur and the founder of Marshall Field and Company, the Chicago-based department stores.  His business was renowned for its then-exceptional level of quality and customer service.

Field is also known for some of his philanthropic donations, providing funding for the Field Museum of Natural History and donating land for the campus of the University of Chicago.

Early life
Marshall Field was born on a farm in Conway, Massachusetts, the son of John Field IV and Fidelia Nash. His family was descended from Puritans who had come to America as early as 1629.

At the age of 17, he moved to Pittsfield, Massachusetts, where he first worked in a dry goods store alongside his brother Joseph Field. He left Massachusetts after five years of working in the dry goods store in search of new opportunities in the rapidly expanding West. In 1856, at age 22, he went to live with his brother in Chicago, Illinois, and obtained employment at leading dry goods merchant Cooley, Wadsworth & Co., which was to become Cooley, Farwell & Co. in 1857.

Career
Field quickly rose through the ranks of Cooley, Farwell & Co. In 1862, for financial reasons Cooley left the firm.  That same year, Field purchased a partnership, and the firm reorganized as Farwell, Field & Co. John V. Farwell appreciated Field's keen business acumen; however, when it came to personality, the two were very different. Field's stuffy efficiency rode on Farwell's more relaxed and cheery demeanor. At a time when business collaboration entailed extensive personal interaction, this partnership would not last long.

In January 1865, Field and a partner, Levi Leiter, accepted an offer to become senior partners at the dry goods establishment of Potter Palmer.  The new firm became known as "Field, Palmer, Leiter & Co."  In 1867, after Field and Leiter could afford to buy him out, Palmer withdrew from the firm, and it was renamed "Field, Leiter & Company." In 1867 Field, Leiter & Company reported revenues of $12 million. Like many Chicago businessmen, Field's company was badly affected by the Great Chicago Fire of 1871, but reopened relatively quickly.  The company also survived the Panic of 1873 because of relatively low levels of debt. By 1881, Field had forced Leiter to sell his share of the business and changed the store's name to "Marshall Field and Company".

Field took an early 19th-century consumer landscape that was centered around the principle of caveat emptor, or "let the buyer beware", and transformed it into a plush shopping experience fit for the Gilded Age. Unconditional refunds, consistent pricing and international imports are among the Field innovations that became standards in quality retailing. Field's employees were also instructed not to push products on uninterested customers, a common practice in stores of the period. The quotes "Give the lady what she wants" and "The customer is always right" are attributed to Field.

Though most famous today for his retail business, during his lifetime his wholesale business made far more money.  During the 1880s, Field's wholesale business generated five times more revenue than retail annually.  The wholesale business even had its own landmark building, the Marshall Field's Wholesale Store, erected in 1887.  Revenue from the Marshall Field's retail business did not surpass the company's wholesale business until after Field's death.

Field was highly suspicious of organized labor throughout his career and prohibited unionization among his employees. During the time of the Haymarket Riot, the wives of the defendants initiated an appeal, to which all of the local businessmen agreed except for Field. Journalist and reformer Henry Demarest Lloyd led a national campaign to grant clemency. Even bankers like Lyman J. Gage favored clemency, believing that moderation would lead to improved relations between capital and labor. Potter Palmer and Charles L. Hutchinson were inclined to agree, but Marshall Field was not. A number of other men confided to Gage that they were not willing to publicly disagree with Field, the wealthiest and most powerful businessman in Chicago. Field would also oppose organized labor during the 1905 Chicago teamsters' strike.

Personal life
Field avoided political and social intrigue, instead focusing on his work and on supporting his family and his favorite philanthropies. Field was a very active member of the Commercial Club and the Jekyll Island Club, also known as the Millionaires Club, on Jekyll Island, Georgia.

Field married twice. In 1863, he married Nannie Douglas Scott of Ironton, Ohio. They had two sons and a daughter, but one son, Louis, died in 1866 as an infant. The surviving children were Marshall Field Jr. and Ethel Field. Marshall Jr. (1868–1905) married Albertine Huck, and they were the parents of Henry Field, Marshall Field III and Gwendolyn Mary Field, who married Sir Archibald Charles Edmonstone, 6th Baronet, grandparents of Archduchess Elyssa (Edmondstone), Grand Duchess of Tuscany. Ethel was married twice, first to Arthur Magie Tree, with whom she had one son, Ronald Tree; and then in 1901 to David Beatty, 1st Earl Beatty, with whom she had two sons, David Beatty, 2nd Earl Beatty and Peter Beatty. Nannie died in 1896. 

In 1904, Field married longtime friend Delia Spencer, the widow of Arthur John Caton. They had no children.

Death

Field died in New York City, New York, on January 16, 1906, at age 71 of pneumonia contracted after playing golf on New Year's Day with his nephew, his secretary and Abraham Lincoln's eldest son Robert Todd Lincoln. Field was buried on January 19 in the Graceland Cemetery in Chicago.

Legacy
After various bequests were made, Field's remaining estate was to be held in trust for 40 years for his two grandsons, with 60% going to Marshall Field III and 40% to Henry Field. In 1905, Field's fortune was valued at $125 million. Henry Field died in 1917, leaving the Field fortune in the hands of Marshall Field III.

The Field Museum of Natural History was named after him in 1894 after he gave it an endowment of one million dollars. Field was initially reluctant to do so, reportedly saying, "I don't know anything about a museum and I don't care to know anything about a museum. I'm not going to give you a million dollars." However he later relented after railroad supplies magnate Edward E. Ayer, another early benefactor (and later first president) of the museum, convinced Field that his everlasting legacy would be achieved by financing the project. The year after his death the Field Museum received a further $8,000,000 in accordance with his will.

The University of Chicago was founded by both Field and New York's John D. Rockefeller, to rival nearby Evanston's Northwestern University.

A bust of Marshall Field stands aside other early 20th century Chicago industrial magnates on the north riverbank on the Chicago River facing the Merchandise Mart.

See also
Marshall Field's, the eponymous department store he founded.
Field Enterprises, holding company for newspapers and TV stations.
Henry Field (1841–1890), brother and business partner of Marshall Field
Marshall Field III (1893–1956), publisher, Chicago Sun founder, investment banker, bankrolled Saul Alinsky
Marshall Field IV, publisher, owner of the Chicago Sun
Frederick "Ted" Field (founder of Interscope Communications and co-founder of Interscope Records)

Notes

References
 
 
 
 
 
 Koehn, Nancy F. Brand New : How Entrepreneurs Earned Consumers' Trust from Wedgwood to Dell (2001) pp 91–136.
 
 
 
 
 Wendt, Lloyd and Herman Kogan, (1952) Give the Lady What She Wants! The Story of Marshall Field & Company. New York: Rand McNally and Company

External links

 

1834 births
1906 deaths
American businesspeople in retailing
Philanthropists from Illinois
People from Conway, Massachusetts
Burials at Graceland Cemetery (Chicago)
Businesspeople from Chicago
People associated with the Field Museum of Natural History
Marshall Field's
Marshall Field family
Retail company founders
19th-century American philanthropists
19th-century American businesspeople